Euphorbia falcata (sickle spurge), is a species of Euphorbia, native to most of Europe, northern Africa, and Asia, and naturalised in other parts of the world.

Two subspecies are recognised:
 Euphorbia falcata subsp. falcata: throughout the range of the species
 Euphorbia falcata subsp. macrostegia (Bornm.) O.Schwartz: restricted to Cyprus and western Turkey

References

falcata
Flora of Africa
Flora of Asia
Flora of Europe
Plants described in 1753
Taxa named by Carl Linnaeus